Alessandro Barsanti (1858–1917) was an Italian architect and Egyptologist who worked for the Egyptian Antiquities Service. He excavated throughout Egypt (most notably he 'discovered' the tomb of Akhenaten in 1891–1892). He was also in charge of the transfer of collection of the Cairo Museum from its site at Giza to the current location in Cairo itself.

Writings 
  (1899–1890). In: Annales du service des antiquités de lÉgypte - Súppleménts (ASAE), 1. Ausgabe 1900. Institut Français d'Archéologie Orientale, Kairo. pp 149–190 & 230–285.
  (1902). In: Annales du service des antiquités de lÉgypte - Súppleménts (ASAE), 3. Ausgabe 1902. Institut Français d'Archéologie Orientale, Kairo. pp 198–202.
  (1904–1905). In: Annales du service des antiquités de lÉgypte - Súppleménts (ASAE), 7. Ausgabe 1906. Institut Français d'Archéologie Orientale, Kairo. pp 257–287.
  (1911–1912). In: Annales du service des antiquités de lÉgypte - Súppleménts (ASAE), 12. Ausgabe 1912. Institut Français d'Archéologie Orientale, Kairo. pp 57–63.

References

 Maria Casini: One hundred years in Egypt: paths of Italian archaeology. Electa, Mailand 2001, OCLC-Nr. 59462809.
 Donato Morelli, Rosario Pintaudi: Cinquant'anni di papirologia in Italia: carteggi Breccia-Comparetti-Norsa-Vitelli, Tomo 1.. Bibliopolis, 1983, pp 103 & 104.
 Christine Beinlich-Seeber: Bibliographie Altägypten, 1822-1946: Indices (= Ägyptologische Abhandlungen, Band 61.). Harrassowitz, Wiesbaden 1998, pp 212.

1858 births
1917 deaths
Italian Egyptologists